For information on all University of Dayton sports, see Dayton Flyers

The Dayton Flyers men's soccer team is a varsity intercollegiate athletic team of University of Dayton in Dayton, Ohio, United States. The team is a member of the Atlantic 10 Conference, which is part of the National Collegiate Athletic Association's Division I. Dayton's first men's soccer team was fielded in 1956. The team plays its home games at Baujan Field in Dayton, Ohio. The Flyers are coached by Dennis Currier.

Current squad

Seasons

NCAA tournament results 

Dayton has appeared in four NCAA tournaments.

Notable alumni 
  Antti Arst
  Jonas Fjeldberg
  Denny Clanton
  Marlon Duran
  Omar Jarun
  Aubrey Kebonnetse
  Isaac Kissi
  Dasan Robinson
  Chris Rolfe
  Amass Amankona
  Lalas Abubakar

References

External links 
 
 Year-by-year results 

 
1956 establishments in Ohio
Association football clubs established in 1956